Great Expectations (a journey through the history of visionary architecture) is a 2007 documentary about the history of visionary architecture by director Jesper Wachtmeister.
The film uses interviews to frame the history of utopian and visionary architecture through the 20th century. Subjects include Le Corbusier, Oscar Niemeyer, Peter Cook, Buckminster Fuller, Moshe Safdie, Antti Lovag, Paolo Soleri, Peter Vetsch and Jacque Fresco.

Reception 
Dagens Nyheter reviewer Tomas Lisinski wrote that "the astounding images of more or less bizarre projects were intertwined with a fantastic interview material. This was also a documentary that treated the viewer seriously. We were assumed capable of following a train of thought, and understanding interviews without meddlesome guidance.”(translated from Swedish)"
Leonardo reviewer Michael R. Mosher wrote that "the architects articulate their visions, and the camera explores at least one of the major built accomplishments of each.  Wachtmeister brings to his documentary a fun and light touch, with little bits of Monty Python-style animation, hand-colored photographs, even flying saucer noises.  Archigram, and its London Pop Art-influenced publications, made him do it!  Sometimes it’s as if the filmmaker really doesn’t put much stock in the promised completion of the Venus Project, but was happy to enjoy the trek in bejungled Florida alongside its talkative old planner Jacques Fresco.”"

References

External links 
 
 Great Expectations, a review by Michael R. Mosher at Leonardo (journal).
 Reality of Utopia, interview with the director Jesper Wachtmeister by Claes Sörstedt for Architecture Film Festival Rotterdam. (Dutch)
 The 30 Architecture Docs to Watch in 2013, Archdaily lists Great expectations as one of the 30 Architecture Docs to Watch in 2013.
 Great Expectations on Canvas, VRT, Canvas, VRT, broadcasts Great Expectations.
 Great Expectations at Docomomo, Australia, Great Expectations screened at Docomomo, Australia.
 Great Expectations at RIBA, Great Expectations screened at RIBA.

Documentary films about architecture
2007 television films
2007 films
Swedish documentary films
2007 documentary films
2000s English-language films
2000s Swedish films
English-language Swedish films